Thin slice may refer to:
Thin-slicing, a term used in psychology and philosophy to describe the ability to find patterns in events based only on "thin slices," or narrow windows, of experience. 
Thin slice, a presentation form for CT scans.
In geology, a thin section.